Frederick, Hereditary Prince of Denmark (11 October 1753 – 7 December 1805) was heir presumptive to the thrones of Denmark and Norway. He was the only surviving son of King Frederick V by his second wife, Juliana Maria of Braunschweig-Wolfenbüttel.

Hereditary Prince Frederick acted as regent on behalf of his half-brother King Christian VII from 1772 to 1784.

Life

Early life

Frederick was born at Christiansborg Palace in Copenhagen on 11 October 1753. To provide for his future position, at the age of 3 he was elected coadjutor in the Prince-Bishopric of Lübeck. This meant that in time he would succeed the Prince-Bishop then in office, Frederick August. This plan had to be abandoned, however, and Frederick stayed in Denmark as a junior member of the royal family.

Marriage
He married Duchess Sophia Frederica of Mecklenburg-Schwerin (1758–1794) in Copenhagen on 21 October 1774. She was a daughter of Duke Louis of Mecklenburg-Schwerin and Princess Charlotte Sophie of Saxe-Coburg-Saalfeld.

Regent of the kingdoms

His elder half-brother, King Christian VII, who had a severe mental illness (believed to have been schizophrenia), and had been divorced from his wife, Caroline Matilda of Great Britain (who was then exiled), Prince Frederick was designated as regent of Denmark-Norway in 1772, when 18 years old. His regency was mostly nominal, the power being held by his mother, Queen Juliane Marie, and minister Ove Høegh-Guldberg.

He acted as regent until the coup of 1784, when his 16-year-old half-nephew Frederick (the future King Frederick VI), took power and regency.

Later life

After the coup, Frederick was left without much influence at the court. 
After Christiansborg Palace was destroyed by fire in 1794, Hereditary Prince Frederick moved with his family to Amalienborg Palace. Sophia Frederica died the same year, shortly after the move. Hereditary Prince Frederick outlived his wife by 11 years and died at Amalienborg Palace on 7 December 1805. Eventually, his son Christian Frederick would succeed Frederick VI as king, first in Norway then in Denmark, and his granddaughter Louise of Hesse-Kassel married the future Christian IX  making Frederick the ancestor of the current Danish Monarchs

In Literature
Prince Frederick is an important character in Norah Lofts' historical novel The Lost Queen (1969), chronicling the tragic marriage of King Christian VII and Queen Caroline Matilda. The book suggests that Frederick was himself in love with the Queen and jealous of her lover Johann Friedrich Struensee – which is not firmly attested in historical sources.

Issue
Stillborn daughter (19 September 1781).
Stillborn daughter (17 February 1783).
Princess Juliana Marie (2 May 1784 – 28 October 1784), died in infancy.
Prince Christian Frederick (18 September 1786 – 20 January 1848), future King Christian Frederick of Norway and Christian VIII of Denmark.
Princess Juliane Sophie (18 February 1788 – 9 May 1850), married in 1812 to Prince William of Hesse-Philippsthal-Barchfeld; they had no issue.
Princess Louise Charlotte (30 October 1789 – 28 March 1864), married in 1810 to Prince William of Hesse-Kassel; they had issue.
Hereditary Prince Ferdinand (22 November 1792 – 29 June 1863), married in 1829 to Princess Caroline of Denmark; they had no issue.

Ancestry

References

Citations

Bibliography

External links

 Frederik the Heir Presumptive at the website of the Royal Danish Collection at Rosenborg Castle

Danish princes
Norwegian princes
House of Oldenburg in Denmark
Regents of Denmark
Regents of Norway
1753 births
1805 deaths
Burials at Roskilde Cathedral
Sons of kings
Non-inheriting heirs presumptive